Ramrao Adik Institute of Technology (RAIT) is a private engineering college located in Nerul, Navi Mumbai, India. It was established in the year 1983. The institute is approved by the Government of Maharashtra and is recognized by the All India Council for Technical Education (AICTE). Since 2020-21, the institute has been affiliated to Padmashree Dr. D. Y. Patil Vidyapeeth, Navi Mumbai. The Computer Engineering, Electronics Engineering, and Electronics and Telecommunications departments have been accredited by the National Board of Accreditation (NBA). The Institute has been given A grade by National Assessment and Accreditation Council (NAAC) during their visit to the college in the second half of 2016.

Campus
RAIT is located in the campus of Dr. D. Y. Patil Vidyapeeth University, Nerul. The  campus houses the Dr. D. Y. Patil Medical College, Dr. D. Y. Patil Dental College and Hospital, the Institute of Hotel Management and Catering Technology, the Colleges of Law, Architecture, Occupational and Physiotherapy, and the Ayurveda College and Hospital. RAIT occupies  of the total area. The infrastructure and facilities include libraries, air-conditioned classrooms, medical rooms, playground, and gymnasium.

Academics 
RAIT offers various courses in engineering, technology, and sciences both in undergraduate and postgraduate levels. It also offers PhD programs for research in computer science and electronics.

Undergraduate programs 
RAIT offers a bachelor's degree in five areas that include:
 Electronics Engineering 
 Computer Science and Engineering 
 Information Technology 
 Electronics and Telecommunication Engineering
 Instrumentation Engineering

Postgraduate programs 
RAIT offers a master's degree in five areas that include:
 Electronics Engineering 
 Computer Science and Engineering 
 Information Technology 
 Electronics and Telecommunication Engineering
 Instrumentation Engineering

Research programs 
The research (PhD) programs offered are:
 Electronics Engineering
 Computer Science and Engineering
 Electronics and Telecommunication Engineering
 Instrumentation Engineering

Extra curricular activities 

RAIT arranges many extra curricular activities. Technical Festival is held twice a year by all the technical committees and open to people outside the college. Cultural Festival called "Horizon" is arranged every year in the months of March (For the first time Culture Festival got cancelled in the year 2020 due to COVID-19 Pandemic), which is one of the best Cultural Festival in all over Mumbai and Navi Mumbai. It is a three day cultural festival which has various events like Live concerts, Fashion shows, EDM concerts, and various entertainment games. Passes are available for people outside not attending the college.

RAIT hosts a charity run called Udaan every year during February or March. It is open to all. Its distance is between 6 to 7 km. The event witnesses huge response from people. The event saw participation of few thousands in the year 2020.

The college also arranges many events for its students like Stamina (Sports event), Cultural days, Teacher's days, etc. RAIT also provides a platform to develop performing arts, literary, and fine arts by encouraging students to participate in various competitions as well organize several state level and national level events.

RAIT also arranges many other social and environmental initiatives like volunteering to help the underprivileged children and the elderly in old age homes, Environmental cleanliness drives, and Environment awareness drives.

Notable alumni
Flight Lt. Gunadnya Kharche, Shaurya Chakra Awardee, 2012, Indian Air Force
Shankar Mahadevan, composer and playback singer

See also
DY Patil Stadium

References

External links
 Official Ramrao Adik Institute of Technology (RAIT) website
 RAIT Alumni Network
 IEEE (RAIT) website
 Official IETE (RAIT) website
 Official CSI (RAIT) website
 Official RAIT Kalaraag website
 Official ISTE (RAIT) website
 Official The Wall (RAIT) website
 Mumbai University
 Official SUC (RAIT) website
 D.Y. Patil Campus

Education in Navi Mumbai
Engineering colleges in Mumbai
Affiliates of the University of Mumbai